The 1841 Kamchatka earthquake occurred in the Pacific Ocean on May 17 at 08:00 local time. The earthquake had an epicenter off the Russian Far East's Kamchatka Peninsula. With an estimated moment magnitude of 9.0 or higher, it is one of the largest to strike the region. A large tsunami accompanied the quake, with up to 15 meters in run-up along the coast.

Tectonic setting
The earthquake occurred off the Kamchatka Peninsula's east coast, which runs parallel to the Kuril-Kamchatka Trench, the area where the Pacific and Okhotsk Sea plates converge. Being older and therefore denser, the Pacific subducts beneath the Kamchatka Peninsula, which sits on the Okhotsk Sea Plate. These two plates meet along a convergent boundary, marked by the trench. The subduction zone is seismogenic and produces Kamchatka earthquakes, which occasionally generate tsunamis; some of these megathrust earthquakes are very strong (such as the 1952 magnitude 9.0 earthquake, the 5th largest ever recorded). Possibly the largest to have hit the peninsula was the 1737 magnitude 9.3 earthquake which generated a large tsunami as well.

Earthquake
The earthquake was associated with thrust faulting on the subduction zone near the east coast of the Kamchatka Peninsula. According to the National Centers for Environmental Information, the earthquake felt area was used to estimate its magnitude at  8.4. A 2004 earthquake catalog placed both the tsunami magnitude and moment magnitude at 9.0, based on evaluating the available tsunami data. No information exists on the source area of the event due to the lack of tsunami records and observation. The 1841 event is thought to be one of a number of large M 8.5+ earthquakes "missing" in the seismological record due to having their magnitudes underestimated. According to Dr. Susan Hough of the U.S. Geological Survey, the earthquake magnitude was underestimated due to the assumption that it did not generate a large-enough tsunami. Earthquakes measuring 8.5 or greater are generally assumed to cause large tsunamis. At the American Geophysical Union fall meeting in 2013, she believes the magnitude could be up to 9.2.

Tsunami
The event caused a large tsunami with a maximum run-up height of 15 meters at the eastern coast. The tsunami washed away yurts belonging to the native population. At Hilo, Hawaii, the tsunami was measured at 4.6 meters. It is Hawaii's first historically recorded tsunami sourced from the Kamchatka Peninsula.

Damage
The earthquake struck the coast and was felt with a maximum intensity of VIII–IX at Petropavlovsk-Kamchatskiy. Up to 15 minutes of violent shaking was felt in the city. At least 50 stove chimneys on homes and government offices collapsed. Some homes suffered severe damage. Cliffs at the coast collapsed. Cathedral bells reportedly rang during the quake.

See also 
 Kamchatka earthquakes
 List of earthquakes in Russia
 List of tsunamis
 List of historical earthquakes
 List of megathrust earthquakes

References 

Earthquakes in the Russian Far East
History of the Kamchatka Peninsula
Megathrust earthquakes in Russia
Tsunamis in Russia
Tsunamis in the United States
1841 disasters in Asia
1841 in the environment
1841 in the Russian Empire
1841 in Asia
1841 disasters in the Russian Empire